Long Danau is a longhouse settlement in the Marudi division of Sarawak, Malaysia.

The longhouse is about three hour’s trek from Ramadu Long Danau has a good reputation with travellers, with good food and a chief who speaks English.

The Bornean Horseshoe Bat (Rhinolophus borneensis) has been observed in Long Danau.

Neighbouring settlements include:

References

Populated places in Sarawak